Haley McCallum (born 1983), professionally known as Haley and formerly Haley Bonar, is a Canadian-born American singer and songwriter who was raised in Rapid City, South Dakota. She has lived in Duluth and currently St. Paul, Minnesota. In 2009, she moved to Portland, Oregon, where she spent a year writing songs for her album Golder, which was released April 19, 2011. She plays acoustic guitar, baritone electric guitar, electric guitar, and Rhodes or Wurlitzer electric piano, either solo or with her Twin Cities-based band, including Jeremy Ylvisaker, Robert Skoro, and Jacob Hanson.

Life and work

In 2003 Haley's album . . . The Size of Planets (Chairkicker's Union) received favorable reviews in the Twin Cities press. The album spawned the single "Am I Allowed," which was played on college radio stations. McCallum was 20 years old when the album was released, and did a number of tours with Duluth band Low upon its release. She also toured with Mason Jennings, Richard Buckner, Rivulets, and Mary Lou Lord, who was also Haley's manager for a time.

In 2006 she released the album Lure the Fox, originally on Mary Ellen Recordings, whose owner, Mary Lewis, decided to help her pay to record the album at Pachyderm Studio after reading a Star Tribune article about her in 2005. Dave King of Happy Apple and The Bad Plus plays drums, Chris Morrissey plays bass, and the album features Low's Alan Sparhawk on the track "Give it Up." Also on that track is David Frankenfeld, Haley's former drummer, who played on The Size of Planets. One year after Lure the Fox was recorded, Haley signed with local label Afternoon Records, who then released the album nationally in October 2006.

Lure the Fox earned Haley two Minnesota Music Awards, one for Best American Roots recording, and another for Best American Roots artist. The album also topped many Twin Cities year-end favorite lists, including those of the Star Tribune, City Pages, The Onion, and Pulse magazine. Haley was also featured on the cover of Metro magazine.

Big Star, released in June 2008 on Afternoon Records, gained Haley a broader audience with songs like "Big Star," "Green Eyed Boy," and "Arms of Harm," which was featured on the credits for an episode of Showtime's The United States of Tara.

Haley is featured on the 2007 Andrew Bird record Armchair Apocrypha and has frequently shared the stage with Bird over the past five  years. She sang on the feature song "Quiet Breathing" from the independent film Sweet Land, directed by fellow Minnesotan Ali Selim. In recent years, she has also collaborated with Actual Wolf and Gary Louris.

In 2009, McCallum's move from St. Paul to Portland, Oregon was noted by City Pages.  She returned to the St. Paul in July 2010 and again became very active in the Twin Cities music scene. Upon completion of her album Golder, released in 2011, she also started a side project band called Gramma's Boyfriend, a "no-wave, new wave, punkish kind of thing that sounds like the Twin Peaks High School prom band." Jeremy Ylvisaker (Andrew Bird, Alpha Consumer, Guitar Party), Jacob Hanson (Halloween, Alaska, Guitar Party, Minneapolis Dub Ensemble), Haley Bonar, Luke Anderson (Rogue Valley, Alpha Centauri), and Mike Lewis (Happy Apple, Fat Kid Wednesdays, Andrew Bird, Gayngs) are all members of Gramma's Boyfriend, though the band's website states that "sometimes they all play together, sometimes its whoever shows up." They have released two albums on Graveface Records, 2013's Human Eye and 2015's Perm.

After two and a half years of writing and recording, Haley released the album Last War in May 2014. The album earned widespread critical acclaim, with Stephen Thompson of NPR calling Haley "a bright, subtle storyteller, [who] displays a mastery of pop-rock craftsmanship that keeps these songs as relentlessly catchy on the surface as they are alluringly complex underneath." SPIN lauded the track "No Sensitive Man" as  "dynamic, demanding," while Consequence of Sound stated that "Bonar creates a whimsical masterclass of indie-pop songwriting." The album earned spots on best-of-2014 lists from Rough Trade, NPR's All Songs Considered, Village Voice and Wondering Sound, the latter of which said of the album, "It’s a bold, confident statement, and it’s an early pick for one of the year’s best."

Her album Impossible Dream was released in August 2016.

Her latest album Pleasureland is recorded under the name HALEY and was released in 2018.

Discography

Albums
Haley Bryn Bonar (Slicktunes Recording, 2001)
9 Song Demo (Self released, 2002)
...The Size of Planets (Chairkicker's Union, 2003)
Lure the Fox (Afternoon Records, 2006)
Big Star (Afternoon Records, 2008)
Golder (Graveface Records, 2011)
Last War (Graveface Records, 2014)
Impossible Dream (Gndwire Records, 2016)
Pleasureland (Memphis Industries, 2018) - Artist credited as ‘Haley’ not ‘Haley Bonar’.

EPs
Lure the Fox EP (Self released, 2004)
Only X-Mas EP (Self released, 2008)
Sing With Me EP (Self released, 2009)
Leo EP (Self released, 2010)
Bad Reputation 7" (Noiseland, 2012)
Wntr Snds (Self released, 2013)
’’Bratt / My Wave - As ‘Haley’ (Memphis Industries - 2018)

with Gramma's Boyfriend
Human Eye (Graveface, 2013)
Perm (Graveface, 2015)

References

External links

 
 set of live videos at scheduletwo.com
 Haley Bonar interview/performance on  MPR (2003)
 Haley Bonar interview/performance on KCMP (2005)
 Haley Bonar interview/performance on KCMP stage at Minnesota State Fair (2006)
 Haley Bonar live interview/performance on KCMP (2008)
 Featured on the PBS program MN Original from the TPT St. Paul, MN Station: MN Original Video
 Last War via Graveface Records
 Audiotree live session
 "Last War" (Official Video) - YouTube I Noisey premiere
 "From A Cage" (featuring Justin Vernon) Video Premiere | Stereogum
 “Kill The Fun” I Stereogum Premiere
 "Eat For Free" (Official Video) | Clash Premiere

1983 births
Musicians from Minneapolis
Musicians from Brandon, Manitoba
American folk musicians
Living people
Musicians from South Dakota
Canadian folk musicians
Memphis Industries artists